TradeWinds is the world's biggest shipping news service, publishing both online news and a printed weekly newspaper, that covers shipping as a global industry. TradeWinds is owned by NHST Media Group and is headquartered in Oslo.

TradeWinds has been setting the maritime agenda for over 25 years and covers all aspects of shipping, focusing especially on news related to owners and the commercial side of the industry. The coverage includes new buildings, sale and purchase activities, chartering, recycling, but also marine insurance casualties and piracy. 

TradeWinds has full-time reporters based in Shanghai, Singapore, New Delhi, Athens, Oslo, Stamford, Connecticut and London.

In 2000, TradeWinds added an online edition which is continuously updated from Singapore, London and Stamford. The TradeWinds App was launched in 2012 and is available on both iOS and Android. And in 2013, these platforms were joined by TW+, a quarterly glossy magazine that has continued the TradeWinds tradition of shaking up the way shipping is covered.

Chief editors
Trond Lillestølen

References

Newspapers published in Norway
Business newspapers
Publications established in 1990
1990 establishments in Norway